is the first single of Eiko Shimamiya under I've Sound and Geneon Entertainment label. Released on May 24, 2006 and reached #18 in the Oricon weekly charts. It has sold an approximate total of 35,000 copies and stayed in the charts for 26 weeks making this Eiko's most selling and longest charting single to date. The title track was used as the opening theme for the first season of the anime series Higurashi: When They Cry, and was also used as the ending theme of the first episode of Higurashi: When They Cry – Gou. Composition wise, it is written in the key of E Minor.

Note: If played backwards, the inclusion of the word Nigerarenai (逃げられない, "you cannot escape") is easily audible; this was later addressed in Shimamiya's second single, “Naraku no Hana”

Track List

References

2006 singles
Eiko Shimamiya songs
Song recordings produced by I've Sound
2006 songs